Sergei Viktorovich Stukashov (born 12 November 1959) is a Russian football manager and a former player.

Honours
 Soviet Top League runner-up: 1986.
 UEFA European Under-19 Football Championship winner: 1978.
 1979 FIFA World Youth Championship runner-up.

International career
Stukashov made his debut for USSR on 28 March 1984 in a friendly against West Germany. He scored two goals in a 1985 friendly against China.

References
  Profile

1959 births
Living people
Soviet footballers
Association football forwards
Soviet Union international footballers
Soviet Top League players
FC Dynamo Moscow players
FC Kairat players
FC Shakhter Karagandy players
Russian football managers
Russian expatriate sportspeople in Kazakhstan
People from Almaty Region